Melody of Love is a 2013 South Korean daily drama television series starring Kim Da-som, Baek Sung-hyun, Hwang Sun-hee, Kim Hyung-jun and Kwak Hee-sung. It aired on KBS1 from November 4, 2013 to June 6, 2014 on Mondays to Fridays at 20:20 for 151 episodes.

Plot
This drama centers on three families whose members learn to appreciate each other, realize the true meaning of family, regret their misbehavior, and repent the hurt they've caused after hardships and trials in the world where individualism is prominent.

Gong Deul-im (Kim Da-som) is a tenacious, outgoing, and optimistic aspiring musical actress with undying passion to pursue her dreams despite going against her parents' wishes. She will have a romantic relationship with lawyer Park Hyun-woo (Baek Sung-hyun). Meanwhile, Han Tae-kyung (Kim Hyung-jun) is the leader of a drama troupe and musical director. He will be acting as a perfectionist, but a gentle and thoughtful man outside of work. He will be working closer with Deul-im and is best friends with Hyun-woo and Deul-im's older sister, Gong Soo-im (Hwang Sun-hee). He will develop feelings for Soo-im.

Cast

Main characters
 Kim Da-som as Gong Deul-im 
 Baek Sung-hyun as Park Hyun-woo 
 Hwang Sun-hee as Gong Soo-im, Deulim's older sister and Tae-kyung's wife.
 Kim Hyung-jun as Han Tae-kyung, Suim's Husband.
 Kwak Hee-sung as Yoon Sang-hyun

Supporting characters
Hyun-woo's family
Sunwoo Jae-duk as Park Beom-jin
Kim Hyeseon as Yoon Ji-young
Park Woong as Park Doo-shik

Soo-im and Deul-im's family
Lee Jung-gil as Gong Jung-nam
Kim Hye-ok as Yoo Jin-soon
Ban Hyo-jung as Jo Gwi-boon
Jung Shi-ah as Gong Jung-ja
Kim Ji-hoon as Kim Sung-hoon
Shin Bi as Noh Jin-yi

Tae-kyung's family
Jung Seung-ho as Han Joo-ho
Kim Ye-ryeong as Goo Mi-ok
Lee Joo-hyun as Goo Se-joon
Jung Da-bin as Han Tae-hee
Jo Soo-min as Lee Ja-hye

Eun Ha Soo Theatrical Troupe
Han Min-chae as Geum Na-ri
Lee Eun-ha as Go Eun-ha
Kim Tae-hyung as Go Min
Jung Yi-yeon as Yeo In-sook
Heo Bo-bae as Bo-bae
Kim Hyun-min as Hyun

Ratings

Awards and nominations

International broadcast
  Thailand: Aired in 2015 on True Asian Visions every Saturday to Tuesday night at 9:00 pm, starting March 14.
  Sri Lanka: Aired in 2015 from September 21 on Derana TV every weeknight at 9:30 pm dubbed in the Sinhalese language.

References

External links
  
 
 

2013 South Korean television series debuts
2014 South Korean television series endings
Korean Broadcasting System television dramas
Korean-language television shows
South Korean romantic comedy television series